Valdotriton is a genus of extinct prehistoric salamanders. Its only known species is Valdotriton gracilis (also known as the Wealden newt). V. gracilis lived during the Late Barremian in what is now Spain. It was found in the Las Hoyas locality. It represents one of the oldest known members of Salamandroidea.

Description
In all specimens, however, the tail was longer than the torso.

See also
 List of prehistoric amphibians

References

Prehistoric amphibian genera
Cretaceous amphibians of Europe
Cretaceous salamanders
Cretaceous Spain
Fossils of Spain
La Huérguina Formation
Fossil taxa described in 1996